Rattlebush is a common name for several plants in the legume family with inflated fruits in which the seeds may rattle:

Baptisia
Crotalaria
Sesbania drummondii, native to the southeastern United States

See also
Rattlebox
Rattlepod
Rattleweed